The Province of Trinidad (1525–1802) was a province of the Spanish Empire which was created in 1525. 

From 1591 to 1731 it was merged with Guayana Province, as Trinidad-Guayana Province. It was lost to the British in 1797, a loss recognised by the Treaty of Amiens in 1802.

History
In 1520 the governorship of Trinidad was granted to Rodrigo de Bastidas, but this was opposed by Diego Columbus, and Bastidas waived the grant. In 1530 the king of Spain handed it over to Antonio Sedeño who was its first governor until 1535 when he abandoned it due to ongoing litigation over jurisdiction with the Province of Cumaná. Its first capital was San José de Oruña, founded in 1592 and destroyed by the English pirate Walter Raleigh.

In 1596, Trinidad was annexed to the Guayana Province under the government of Antonio de Berrío, who had governed the island since 1591. The province was overseen by the president of the Real Audiencia of Santo Domingo, which served as its court of appeal, until 1739 when it was transferred over to the Viceroyalty of New Granada and the Audiencia of Bogotá.

The province was returned to the jurisdiction of the Santo Domingo Audiencia and placed in the Captaincy General of Venezuela in 1777. With the establishment of the Audiencia of Caracas in 1786, all administrative and judicial functions were centered on Caracas.

Finally in 1797, a British fleet commanded by Henry Harvey seized the island turning it into a British colony. Its loss was recognised at the Treaty of Amiens in 1802.

See also
History of Trinidad and Tobago
Colonial Venezuela
Governorate of New Andalusia (1501–13) 
New Andalusia Province (1537–1864) 
Captaincy General of Venezuela (1777–1823)

Sources
Fundación Polar (1997). "Trinidad, gobernacion de" in Diccionario de Historia de Venezuela. Caracas: Fundación Polar.

References

Colonial Venezuela
Spanish period of Trinidad and Tobago
Provinces of the Spanish Empire
States and territories established in 1525
1525 establishments in the Spanish Empire
1525 establishments in South America
16th-century establishments in Venezuela
States and territories disestablished in 1802
1802 disestablishments in the Spanish Empire
1802 establishments in South America
16th century in Venezuela
17th century in Venezuela
18th century in Venezuela